Gregory Norman Bossert (born January 9, 1962) is an American writer and filmmaker. He has won the World Fantasy Award and is a finalist for the Sturgeon Award.  He lives in Marin County, California and works at Industrial Light & Magic.

Writing 

Bossert's first sale was to Asimov's Science Fiction in 2009.  He attended the Clarion Workshop in 2010.
His story "The Telling" from Beneath Ceaseless Skies #109, November 2012, won the World Fantasy Award for Best Short Story, and his story "Bloom" from Asimov's Science Fiction, December 2013, is a finalist for the 2014 Theodore Sturgeon Award.  Both stories also appeared on Locus Online yearly recommended reading lists.

Film 

Bossert works in the feature film industry.  He also creates short animated films, including the One Minute Weird Tales series for Weird Tales, and promotional videos for Abrams Books and Cheeky Frawg Books.

Awards 

 The Telling (2013) (World Fantasy Award for Best Short Story)
 "Bloom" (2014) (Finalist for the Theodore Sturgeon Award)

Bibliography

Short fiction 
The Night Soil Salvagers 2020

Stories

Notes

External links 

 
 
 
 

1962 births
Living people
21st-century American short story writers
21st-century American male writers
American fantasy writers
American horror writers
American male short story writers
American science fiction writers
Asimov's Science Fiction people
Novelists from Massachusetts
World Fantasy Award-winning writers
Writers from Boston